The Magical Reality of Nadia is a 2021 children's book by Bassem Yousef and Catherine R. Daly, published by Scholastic Books. The illustrator is Douglas Holgate.

It is about a girl named Nadia, a student at a California middle school, who finds she has a magical amulet after being bullied by a student over her Egyptian American ethnicity.

In 2020 Youssef had plans to make a television show out of the series.

Reception
Publishers Weekly wrote that "Youssef and Daly strike a solid balance between magical worldbuilding, witty humor, and a unifying anti-xenophobic theme."

Kirkus Reviews wrote "Readers will cheer for Nadia."

References

External links

  - Scholastic Canada

2021 children's books
Egyptian-American culture
Scholastic Corporation books